Shamo is a 2007 Hong Kong martial arts film directed by Soi Cheang, based on the Japanese manga of the same name. The film stars Shawn Yue as a student who murders his parents, and, while in prison, is trained to become a violent, professional fighter by a fellow inmate played by Francis Ng.

Cast
Shawn Yue as Ryo Narushima
Annie Liu as Megumi
Francis Ng as Kenji Kurokawa
Masato as Naoto Sugawara
Ryo Ishibashi as Principal Saeki
Dylan Kuo as Ryuichi Yamazaki
Bruce Leung as Kensuke Mochizuki
Pei Pei as Natsumi Narushima
Zing Chau as Kouhei Fujiyoshi

Accolades

External links

2007 films
2000s Cantonese-language films
2007 action films
2007 martial arts films
Hong Kong action films
Hong Kong martial arts films
Films directed by Cheang Pou-soi
Live-action films based on manga
2000s Hong Kong films